Little Walker Caldera is a depression in the eastern Sierra Nevada in California that is adjacent to the Sweetwater Mountains. The caldera is named for the Little Walker River. U.S. Route 395 in California crosses the Northern boundary of the caldera, just west of the Devil's Gate Pass. California State Route 108 follows more of the northern boundary of the caldera.

Little Walker Caldera last produced a major eruption about 9 million years ago.  Andesitic lava and tuff from the series of three eruptive events are found several hundred feet thick as far away as Antelope Valley, Mono County, 20 miles north, Bridgeport Valley to the south, and Sonora 60 miles to the west.  The lava flows near Sonora are readily visible from California State Route 108 and followed the gold laden stream beds in the area.  Rich placer gold deposits have been revealed by excavating the ancient stream beds that lie underneath the lava flows.

The Little Walker Caldera is classified as extinct, although it continues to produce substantial hot spring activity and occasional earthquakes.

Some parts of the Little Walker Caldera overlap the northernmost extent of the Yosemite National Park.

References

External links
Schweich.com
GeoScienceWorld
Eurekalert.org

Volcanoes of Mono County, California
Volcanism of California
Calderas of California
Volcanoes of California
Miocene calderas